A clip-on tie is a bow tie or necktie which is permanently tied, and worn by attaching it to the front of the shirt collar by a clip. Alternately, especially in the case of bow ties, the tie may have a band around the neck fastened with a hook and eye.

Reasons for use 
The following are some reasons that this style of tie may be used:
 Tightly tied standard neckties may be a source of irritation and discomfort.
 Some people, particularly children, do not know how to tie a standard necktie, or do not feel comfortable tying one. 
 Some persons with disabilities may be physically incapable of tying a tie, or only capable of it with extreme difficulty.
 Police officers and security guards often wear clip-ons as a precaution against being strangled by a pulled necktie. (With uniform, a tie clip may be used to keep the tie from "flying" in the wind.)
 Some schools require clip-on ties as part of their uniform instead of regular ties as this keeps students from loosening them in hot weather.
 A clip-on tie can be put on more quickly than a conventional necktie.
 A clip-on tie is used as a safety precaution in a manufacturing setting to avoid neck injury due to machine entanglement. 

Neckties